The Roth Open Swiss Teams is a national bridge championship Swiss Teams event held at the summer American Contract Bridge League (ACBL) North American Bridge Championship (NABC).

History
Known originally as the Open Swiss Teams, it is a national-rated event first held in 2005 and renamed in 2010 as the Roth Open Swiss Teams in honor of Al Roth. The event is a four-session Swiss teams, with two qualifying and two final sessions, typically starting on the second Saturday of the summer NABC; it is open. Scoring is by IMPs that are converted to victory points.

Winners

References

Sources
List of previous winners, Page 2

2007 winners, Page 1

2008 winners, Page 1

2019 winners, Page 1

External links
 

North American Bridge Championships